Krystyna Kacperczyk (born 13 October 1948) is a Polish sprinter. She competed in the women's 400 metres at the 1972 Summer Olympics.

References

External links
 

1948 births
Living people
Athletes (track and field) at the 1972 Summer Olympics
Polish female sprinters
Olympic athletes of Poland
Place of birth missing (living people)
Jagiellonia Białystok athletes
Skra Warszawa athletes
Olympic female sprinters